Paramycetophylax is a genus of fungus-growing ants in the subfamily Myrmicinae. It contains the single species Paramycetophylax bruchi, known only from Argentina. Workers collect leaflets from Prosopis flexuosa that they bring back to the nest to act as substrate for the fungus.

References

Myrmicinae
Endemic fauna of Argentina
Hymenoptera of South America
Monotypic ant genera